Carl Peters (27 September 1856 – 10 September 1918), was a German colonial ruler, explorer, politician and author and a major promoter of the establishment of the German colony of East Africa (part of the modern republic Tanzania).

Life

He was born at Neuhaus an der Elbe in the Kingdom of Hanover, the son of a Lutheran clergyman. Peters studied history and philosophy at the universities of Göttingen and Tübingen, and at the Humboldt University of Berlin as a student of Heinrich von Treitschke. During 1879, he was awarded a gold medal by the Frederick William University for his dissertation concerning the 1177 Treaty of Venice and habilitated with a treatise concerning Arthur Schopenhauer.

East Africa Company
Instead of becoming a teacher, Peters after his studies moved to London, where he stayed with his recently widowed maternal uncle, Carl Engel, on Addison Road. Engel was a distinguished composer and musical essayist, the brother-in-law of the ophthalmologist Sir William Bowman, and lived the life of a gentleman. During his time in London, Peters was offered the opportunity of becoming a British subject, which he rejected due to his German nationalist sympathies. Having studied the principles of European colonialism during his foreign sojourn, when Peters returned to Berlin he initiated the Society for German Colonization (Gesellschaft für Deutsche Kolonisation), a pressure group for the acquisition of colonies by Germany. 

During the autumn of 1884 he proceeded with two companions to East Africa, and concluded in the name of his society treaties with the chiefs of Useguha, Nguru, Ijsagara and Ukami. Returning to Europe early during 1885, he formed the German East Africa Company.

The German government of Chancellor Otto von Bismarck, fearing the effect on relations with the British, was originally opposed to these plans, and had refused any funding when Peters began. Bismarck refused a second time when Peters returned to Germany during the last days of the Berlin Conference of 1884, demanding an imperial charter. Peters, however, threatened the Chancellor successfully by threatening to sell his acquisitions to King Leopold II of Belgium who was eager to expand his territory of Congo. As Bismarck's National Liberal Party allies in the Reichstag parliament were pro-colonial anyway, he finally agreed and the charter was granted. This constituted the necessary beginning for further expansion on the East African mainland during the years ensuing. During 1888 Peters achieved an agreement with Sultan Khalifah bin Said of Zanzibar who leased his coastal dominions in what was to be Tanganyika to the German East Africa Company.

During the same year Peters began an expedition from the east coast of Africa, avowedly for the relief of Emin Pasha, actually to extend the area of German influence in Uganda and Equatoria. This expedition was not sanctioned by the German government and was regarded by local British authorities as a filibuster (in the 19th century sense of the word). Reaching Uganda during early 1890, Peters concluded a treaty with Kabaka Mwanga II of Buganda in favour of Germany.

He had to leave Uganda hastily on the approach of an expedition commanded by Frederick Lugard, the representative of the Imperial British East Africa Company. On reaching Zanzibar he learned that his efforts were useless, as on 1 July 1890 the Heligoland–Zanzibar Treaty between Germany and the UK had been signed, whereby Uganda was left as an area of British influence and Peters's agreement with Mwanga became null and void. Meanwhile, the power of his company had ended when the coastal population rebelled in the Abushiri Revolt against the implementation of the lease agreement between the Sultan and the Germans. The German government had to intervene by sending troops commanded by Hermann Wissmann, ended the insurrection and assumed ownership of the company's possessions as a colony.

Nevertheless, on his return to Germany Peters was received with great honours, and during 1891 published an account of his expedition entitled Die deutsche Emin Pasha Expedition, which was translated into English. He also endorsed the foundation of the Alldeutscher Verband in protest against the Heligoland-Zanzibar Treaty.

Reichskommissar
During 1891 he went out again to East Africa as Reichskommissar (Imperial High Commissioner) for the Kilimanjaro Region in Moshi, however subordinate to Wissmann, and during 1892 was one of the commissioners for delimiting the Anglo-German boundary with the British East Africa Company in that region. During the same time Peters by his brutal behaviour against the local population provoked a rebellion which was to cost him his office. He used local girls as concubines and, when he discovered that his lover Jagoda had an affair with his man-servant Mabruk, he had both of them sentenced for theft and treason and hanged by a court-martial and their home villages destroyed. The incident, at first not reported by Peters, provoked resistance by the local Chaga people and again necessitated costly military action.

Peters was recalled to Berlin and employed in the Imperial Colonial Office from 1893 to 1895, while official accusations were brought against him of excesses in regard to his treatment of the native population. In a session of the Reichstag on 13 March 1896 August Bebel, chairman of the Social Democratic Party, finally made the killings public, citing from a self-exculpatory letter by Peters to Bishop Alfred Tucker. Peters denied the authenticity of the letter but had to admit the executions. After three investigations he was, during 1897, dishonorably deprived of his commission for misuse of official power, losing all his pension benefits.

He evaded the final sentence and further criminal prosecution by relocating to London, where he occupied himself with schemes for exploiting parts of Rhodesia and Portuguese East Africa. In the interests of a gold mining company he formed, Peters explored the Fura district and Macombes country on the Zambezi river, where during 1899 he discovered ruins of cities and deserted gold mines of the medieval Kingdom of Mutapa, which he identified as the legendary ancient lands of Ophir. He returned during 1901 and gave an account of his explorations in Im Goldland des Altertums (The Eldorado of the Ancients) (1902). During 1905 he again visited the region between the rivers Zambezi and Save.

Legacy
Besides the books already mentioned and some smaller treatises Peters published a philosophical work entitled Willenswelt und Weltwille (1883), and a disquisition on early gold production entitled Das goldene Ophir Salomo's (1895), translated into English during 1898.

A proponent of Social Darwinism and the Völkisch philosophy, his attitude towards the indigenous population made him one of the most controversial colonizers even during his lifetime. Among colonial minded people he was feted as a national hero. During 1914, he was able to return to Germany, after Emperor Wilhelm II by personal decree had bestowed upon him the right to use the title of an Imperial Commissioner again and had given him a pension from his personal budget, while the sentence by the disciplinary court remained in effect. Peters was rehabilitated officially by personal decree of Adolf Hitler 20 years after his death. Peters was celebrated as a national hero during the Nazi era. During World War II, the Kriegsmarine fleet tender Carl Peters was named after him. He was also the subject of a 1941 propaganda film, Carl Peters, by Herbert Selpin, featuring Hans Albers.

A number of towns in Germany had streets named after Peters but during recent years some of them received different names after debate concerning his legacy. For example, Petersallee in the Afrikanisches Viertel in Berlin was originally named after Carl Peters, but was rededicated during 1986 to Hans Peters, a member of the anti-Nazi resistance.

Critics among Social Democrats, Catholic and Free-minded politicians considered Peters a national shame. The Austrian Africanist Oscar Baumann referred to him as "half crazy". One of his nicknames in the German critical press was Hänge-Peters ("Hangman-Peters").

See also
Research Materials: Max Planck Society Archive.

Notes

References 
 Norbert Aas, Werena Rosenke (Hg.): Kolonialgeschichte im Familienalbum. Frühe Fotos aus der Kolonie Deutsch-Ostafrika. . In this book, Werena Rosenke devotes an extensive essay to Carl Peters.
 E. Salburg: Karl Peters und sein Volk. Duncker Verlag, 1929
 Winfried Speitkamp: "Totengedenken als Berlin-Kritik. Der Kult um die Kolonialpioniere". In: Ulrich van der Heyden, Joachim Zeller (Ed.) "... Macht und Anteil an der Weltherrschaft." Berlin und der deutsche Kolonialismus. Unrast-Verlag. Münster 2005, 
 Hermann Krätschell: Carl Peters 1856 – 1918. Ein Beitrag zur Publizistik des imperialistischen Nationalismus in Deutschland, Berlin-Dahlem 1959.  Doctoral thesis discussing Peters's impact on journalism in view of Nazism, which developed later.
 Arne Perras: Carl Peters and German Imperialism 1856–1918. A political Biography, Clarendon Press, Oxford 2004. .  Exhaustive biography of Peters with a dissertation on his political weight in view of Bismarck's colonial politics; research includes sources only recently made available.
 Peter Rohrbacher: Deutsche Missionsinitiativen am Campo Santo Teutonico: Die Missionsbenediktiner in Deutsch-Ostafrika und die Nordischen Missionen , in: Stefan Heid und Karl-Joseph Hummel (Hg.), Päpstlichkeit & Patriotismus. Der Campo Santo Teutonico: Ort der Deutschen in Rom zwischen Risorgimento und Erstem Weltkrieg (1870–1918) (Römische Quartalschrift für Christliche Altertumskunde und Kirchengeschichte) 113, 2 (2018), 613–643

Attribution

External links 
Biografie (In German, at homepage of German Historical Museum)
 Paper on the German colonial policy by the example of German East Africa (In German)
 Deutsches Kolonial-Lexikon Letter P – Peters (In German)
 Apology of Peters at jadu.de
 Excerpt from Peters's memories about the establishment of German East Africa (In German)
 Das Geschichtsprojekt Afrika-Hamburg about Peters (in German)
 Bequest of Carl Peters in the archive of 'Märkischer Kreis'
 

 

1856 births
1918 deaths
People from Lüneburg (district)
People from the Kingdom of Hanover
Governors of German East Africa
Colonial people of German East Africa
German explorers of Africa
Alldeutscher Verband members
University of Göttingen alumni
University of Tübingen alumni
Humboldt University of Berlin alumni